Jean Carmet (25 April 1920 – 20 April 1994) was a French actor.

Life and career
Jean Carmet began working on stage and then in film in the early 1940s becoming a very popular comedic actor in his native country. He is best known internationally for his role as a French colonist in the 1976 film, La Victoire en Chantant (Black and White in Color).

Because of his good-natured manner, he was as popular with members of the film crew as he was with the audiences. During his long career, he appeared in more than 200 films, and although he played dramatic parts, he usually acted in a supporting role as a comedic character.

He was nominated for the César Award for Best Actor for his leading role in the 1986 film, Miss Mona. Twice he won the César Award for Best Actor in a Supporting Role and was nominated on two other occasions. In February 1994, to celebrate his 50th year in film, he was honored by the French motion picture industry with a special César Award. Just a few months later, Jean Carmet died of a heart attack.

Jean Carmet is interred in the Cimetière du Montparnasse in Paris. In his birthplace of Bourgueil, a theater and an avenue were named in his honor.

Awards
1995 - 7 d'Or for his role in Eugénie Grandet
1994 - Honorary César Award
1992 - César Award for Best Actor in a Supporting Role for the film Merci la vie
1983 - César Award for Best Actor in a Supporting Role for the film Les Misérables

Nominations
1988 - César Award for Best Actor for the film Miss Mona
1987 - César Award for Best Actor in a Supporting Role for the film Les Fugitifs
1979 - César Award for Best Actor for the film Le sucre
1979 - César Award for Best Actor in a Supporting Role for the film Le sucre

Selected filmography

The Pavilion Burns (1941)
Le journal tombe à cinq heures (1942) - Un typographe (uncredited)
The Mysteries of Paris (1943) - (uncredited)
Children of Paradise (1945) - Un spectateur au paradis des Funambules (uncredited)
François Villon (1945) - Un compagnon de François (uncredited)
Les démons de l'aube (1946) - Durand, dit Durandal
Tombé du ciel (1946)
Dropped from Heaven (1946) - La troisième complice
Copie conforme (1947) - Le troisième complice
Monsieur Vincent (1947) - L'abbé Pontail
Le diamant de cent sous (1948) - Un invité
Le destin exécrable de Guillemette Babin (1948) - Étienne
La bataille du feu (1949) - Albert Farjon
Bonheur en location (1949) - Guy Piponnet
I Like Only You (1949) - Le père affolé (uncredited)
The Wolf (1949) - Gustave
Dernière heure, édition spéciale (1949) - Nestor
The Perfume of the Lady in Black (1949) - Le garagiste (uncredited)
 Branquignol (1949) - Bidel - un fantaisiste raté
Not Any Weekend for Our Love (1950) - Le pianiste malade (uncredited)
Cartouche, King of Paris (1950) - Brin d'Amour, un soldat
La patronne (1950) - Le brigadier
Les femmes sont folles (1950) - Emile
 God Needs Men (1950) - Yvon
Le Roi des camelots (1951) - La Globule
Dr. Knock (1951) - Le premier gars
Les mémoires de la vache Yolande (1951) - Le clerc
 They Were Five (1952) - Jean - le postier
Les quatre sergents du Fort Carré (1952) - Le Guen
 Monsieur Leguignon, Signalman (1952) - M. Grosjean - policier et habitant du quartier
La forêt de l'adieu (1952) - Baptiste
Monsieur Taxi (1952) - François
Bille de clown (1952) - Gaston Lemeunier
Drôle de noce (1952) - Paullaud
She and Me (1952) - Gaston
Minuit... Quai de Bercy (1953) - Merle, l'adjoint de l'inspecteur
Des quintuplés au pensionnat (1953) - Antoine
The Tour of the Grand Dukes (1953) - Le curé du village
Piédalu député (1954)
 Adam Is Eve (1954) - Gaston
Le vicomte de Bragelonne (1954) - (uncredited)
Les Duraton (1955) - Gaston Duvet dans l'émission radiophonique
Ça va barder (1955) - Alvarez
 Madelon (1955) - Le soldat Mathieu
Bonjour sourire (1956) - Jean Courtebride
Mon curé champion du régiment (1956) - Le caporal Tiroir
Trois de la Canebière (1956) - (uncredited)
Ces sacrées vacances (1956) - Le deuxième inspecteur
Bébés à gogo (1956) - Hubert
Les Aventures de Till L'Espiègle (1956) - Lamme
La ironía del dinero (1957) - Feliciano (segment "Francia")
Three Sailors (1957) - Papillote
Mademoiselle et son gang (1957) - Dédé
The Amorous Corporal (1958) - Balluché
Oh! Qué mambo (1959) - Jo le Bègue
Cigarettes, Whiskey and Wild Women (1959) - Martial
Babette Goes to War (1959) - Antoine (uncredited)
La Belle Américaine (1961) - Le malandrin / The Burglar
The Three Musketeers (1961) - Planchet
The Elusive Corporal (1962) - Guillaume
The Devil and the Ten Commandments (1962) - Le clochard / Tramp (segment "Bien d'autrui ne prendras")
Un clair de lune à Maubeuge (1962) - Le chauffeur
We Will Go to Deauville (1962) - Le porteur
Any Number Can Win (1963) - Le barman
La foire aux cancres (Chronique d'une année scolaire) (1963) - Le chef de gare
Du grabuge chez les veuves (1964) - L'horloger à l'enterrement
Les Pas perdus (1964) - Déde Lemartin
The Counterfeit Constable (1964) - Le porte drapeau
The Gorillas (1964) - La Fauche
The Two Orphans (1965) - Picard
La Métamorphose des cloportes (1965)  - Le critique d'art efféminé (uncredited)
Les Bons Vivants (1965) - Paulo (Le voleur de la lanterne) (segment "Procès, Le")
Your Money or Your Life (1966) - Le curé
Roger la Honte (1966) - Tristot
 An Idiot in Paris (1967) - Ernest Grafouillères
Alexandre le bienheureux (1968) - La Fringale
Faut pas prendre les enfants du bon Dieu pour des canards sauvages (1968) - Le supertitieux / The superstitious security guard (uncredited)
L'auvergnat et l'autobus (1969) - L'homme qui veut acheter l'autobus (uncredited)
Les gros malins (1969) - Le percepteur
Un merveilleux parfum d'oseille (1969) - Karl de Kerfuntel
 A Golden Widow (1969) - Un membre du Yiddish International Power
Poussez pas grand-père dans les cactus (1969) - The owner of the café
Elle boit pas, elle fume pas, elle drague pas, mais... elle cause ! (1969) - Bartender
And Soon the Darkness (1970) - Renier
La Rupture (1970) - Henri Pinelli
Les Novices (1970) - Le client au chien
The Little Theatre of Jean Renoir (1970, TV Movie) - Le docteur Féraud (segment "Le roi d'Yvetot")
Le cri du cormoran, le soir au-dessus des jonques (1971) - Gegene
L'homme qui vient de la nuit (1971) - Angelo
Just Before Nightfall (1971) - Jeannot
Le drapeau noir flotte sur la marmite (1971) - Staline
Le Viager (1972) - Maître Vierzon, l'avocat de Noël
L'ingénu (1972) - Le pêcheur
Les malheurs d'Alfred (1972) - Paul
Les yeux fermés (1972) - Raoul
Five Leaf Clover (1972) - Lord Picratt
Elle cause plus, elle flingue (1972) - Jambe de laine
Le Grand Blond avec une chaussure noire (1972) - Maurice
La raison du plus fou (1973) - Le mari de la directrice
Le Concierge (1973) - Ludovic
Don't Cry with Your Mouth Full (1973) - Louis - le père
Les grands sentiments font les bons gueuletons (1973) - Georges Armand
Ursule et Grelu (1974) - Lucien
Les Gaspards (1974) - Paul Bourru, le marchands de vins
La gueule de l'emploi (1974) - Le restaurateur
Comment réussir quand on est con et pleurnichard (1974) - Antoine Robineau
Un linceul n'a pas de poches (1974) - Comissaire Bude
Bons baisers... à lundi (1974) - Henri-Pierre - le chef d'un trio de malfaiteurs médiocres
The Return of the Tall Blond Man (1974) - Maurice Lefebvre
The Common Man (1975) - Georges Lajoie
Trop c'est trop (1975)
Scrambled Eggs (1976) - Marcel Dutilleul
La Victoire en Chantant (1976) - Le sergent Bosselet
Alice ou la dernière fugue (1977) - Colas
Rene the Cane (1977) - L'indicateur
The More It Goes, the Less It Goes (1977) - Inspecteur Melville
The Seventh Company Outdoors (1977) - M. Albert, le passeur
Le beaujolais nouveau est arrivé (1978) - Camadule
Violette Nozière (1978) - Baptiste Nozière
Le sucre (1978) - Adrien Courtois
Un si joli village (1979) - Le Juge Noblet
Il y a longtemps que je t'aime (1979) - François Dupuis
Gros-Câlin (1979) - Emile Cousin
Buffet froid (1979) - L'assassin / The murderer
The Lady Banker (1980) - Duvernet
Allons z'enfants (1981) - L'adjudant Chalumot
L'amour trop fort (1981) - Max
Circle of Deceit (1981) - Rudnik
Dead Certain (1981) - Kreps
La soupe aux choux (1981) - Francis Chérasse (Le Bombé)
Guy de Maupassant (1982) - François
Les Misérables (1982) - Thénardier
Pick Up Your Belongings (1983) - Joseph Cohen
Papy fait de la résistance (1983) - André Bourdelle
Dog Day (1984) - Socrate
Tir à vue (1984) - L'inspecteur Robert Casti
Sac de noeuds (1985) - M. Buzinski - un pharmacien qui hait les flics
Night Magic (1985) - Sam
Le matou (1985) - Egon Ratablavasky
Mon beau-frère a tué ma soeur (1986) - Jocelyn Bouloire
Suivez mon regard (1986) - Désiré, le paysan
Les Fugitifs (1986) - Martin
Miss Mona (1987) - Miss Mona
La brute (1987) - M. Deliot
Le Moine et la sorcière (1987) - Le curé / Vicar
Les 2 crocodiles (1987) - Emile Rivereau
L'âge de Monsieur est avancé (1987) - Le régisseur / Désiré
Mangeclous (1988) - Scipion
La vouivre (1989) - Réquiem
Champagne amer (1989) - Zigou
Périgord noir (1989) - Jean-Lou
L'invité surprise (1989) - Le colonel
Un jeu d'enfant (1990) - Le grand-père
Le sixième doigt (1990) - Le commandant
My Mother's Castle (1990) - Le garde ivrogne
Merci la vie (1991) - Raymond Pelleveau (Old Father)
La reine blanche (1991) - Lucien
Le bal des casse-pieds (1992) - M. Vandubas
Coup de jeune (1993) - Ponsard
Roulez jeunesse! (1993) - Michel
La chambre 108 (1993) - René Bertillon
Germinal (1993) - Vincent Maheu dit Bonnemort
Cache Cash (1994) - Durandet
Eugénie Grandet (1993, TV Movie) - Monsieur Grandet

References
Adapted from the article Jean Carmet, from Wikinfo, licensed under the GNU Free Documentation License.

External links

1920 births
1994 deaths
People from Indre-et-Loire
Burials at Montparnasse Cemetery
Recipients of the Order of Agricultural Merit
French male film actors
French male stage actors
French male television actors
20th-century French male actors
Best Supporting Actor César Award winners
César Honorary Award recipients